The Garlington Building is a building in Downtown Missoula, Montana. It is located at the 350 Ryman St. The building is a postmodern design. The building's abbreviated name is the GLR Building. It was the first project in Montana financed with federal New Markets Tax Credits.

Purpose 
This post-modern building fits with the Missoula Downtown Master Plan, which the city of Missoula has teamed up with the Missoula Downtown Association. The main tenant for this new building is Garlington Law Firm.

References

See also 
Missoula, Montana
Missoula County, Montana

Buildings and structures in Missoula, Montana
Office buildings completed in 2010
Office buildings in Montana